The Nepal Engineering College (nec) was established in 1994 as the first privately led not-for-profit social organization providing engineering education in Nepal and is the largest engineering college in terms annual student intake as well as in terms of area. Its main campus is located at Changunarayan, Bhaktapur. A second campus, in which Bachelors for Diploma Holders programs are run, is located at Mahalaxmisthan and a third campus, in which Masters Programs are run, is located at Prayag Pokhari, Lagankhel, Lalitpur. Established on 25 September 1994, the college currently offers engineering degrees at the bachelor's and master's levels. Nepal Engineering College offers Bachelor level courses in Civil Engineering, Electronics and Communication Engineering, Computer Engineering, Electrical and Electronics Engineering, Civil and Rural Engineering and Civil Engineering for Diploma Holders leading to B.E. (Bachelor of Engineering) degree, Bachelor level course in Architecture leading to B. Arch (Bachelor of Architecture) degree, and Postgraduate courses leading to Master of Science (M.Sc.) degree in Construction Management (CM), Natural Resource Management (NRM), Interdisciplinary Water Resources Management (IWRM) and Transportation Engineering and Management (TEAM). Nepal Engineering College is affiliated to Pokhara University.

External links
 http://www.nec.edu.np/

Engineering universities and colleges in Nepal
1994 establishments in Nepal